Ducis Rodgers is an American sportscaster for WPVI-TV in Philadelphia.

Prior to joining the Action News sports team in 2012, Rogers worked at WCBS-TV as a sports director from 2003 to 2009. He also worked at ESPN as a host for Sportscenter and Outside The Lines.

Rodgers graduated from Columbia College Chicago with a degree in broadcast journalism.

He is married to retired television reporter Diana Perez.

References

Year of birth missing (living people)
Living people
American television sports anchors
Columbia College Chicago alumni
Place of birth missing (living people)